Cearbhall mac Lochlainn Ó Dálaigh (died 1404) was an Irish poet.

Described as Chief Ollam of Ireland in poetry, Cearbhall died in Corcomroe, County Clare in 1405. Edward O'Reilly gives a description in his Dictionary of Irish Writers under the year AD 1404, paragraph CLIV.

His obit is given in the Annals of Ulster as follows- "U1405.2 Cerball Ua Dalaigh, namely, ollam of Corcomruadh, died."

His obit is given in the Annals of the Four Masters as follows- "M1404.9 Carroll O'Daly, Ollav of Corcomroe died".

His obit is given in the Annals of Connacht as follows- "1404.20 Cerball O Dalaig, ollav in Poetry of Corcumroe, died."

See also

 Cú Connacht Ó Dálaigh, died 1139
 Máel Íosa Ó Dálaigh, died 1185
 Donnchadh Mór Ó Dálaigh, died 1244
 Muireadhach Albanach, alive 1228
 Gofraidh Fionn Ó Dálaigh, died 1387
 Aonghus Fionn Ó Dálaigh, died 1570
 Lochlann Óg Ó Dálaigh, fl. c. 1610
 Cearbhall Óg Ó Dálaigh, fl. 1630

References

External links
 http://www.ucc.ie/celt/published/T100005D/

Medieval Irish poets
14th-century Irish poets
14th-century Irish writers
People from County Clare
Irish male poets